Fantasy Land is a 1981 board game designed by Gary Lange and published by Lange Games.

Gameplay
Fantasy Land is a game set in Fantasyland, where players compete in World War I aerial dogfights, magical duels, gunfights, jousts, space battles, and gladiatorial contests.

Reception
Paul O'Connor reviewed Fantasy Land in The Space Gamer No. 45. O'Connor commented that "Fantasy Land is an absolute disaster at any price. If you see this turkey in a store, draw a gun and shoot it."

References

Board games introduced in 1981